Tianmu Campus, University of Taipei is a campus in Dunhua North Road, Songshan District, Taipei, Taiwan.

History
The campus was originally founded as Taipei Physical Education College in 1968. In August 2013, it was merged with Taipei Municipal University of Education to form the University of Taipei.

Current squad

External links
 Taipei Physical Education College website

1968 establishments in Taiwan
2013 disestablishments in Taiwan
Defunct universities and colleges in Taiwan
Educational institutions established in 1968
University of Taipei
Educational institutions disestablished in 2013